Christminster may refer to:

 Christ the Saviour Monastery, a Benedictine orthodox monastery located in Hamilton, Ontario, Canada
 Christminster (fiction), a fictional town and university in Thomas Hardy's novel Jude the Obscure